Craft Wars is an American reality show that premiered on June 26, 2012  on TLC.  It is hosted by Tori Spelling and has contestants competing in craft challenges to win a $10,000 prize. The contestants' crafts are judged by Erica Domesek, Stephen Brown, and Jo Pearson (a longtime affiliate of Michaels).

Series overview

Episodes

Season 1

References

External links
TLC: Craft Wars Official Page

TLC (TV network) original programming
2010s American reality television series
2012 American television series debuts
2012 American television series endings